Henry August "Hank" Kuehne II (born September 11, 1975) is an American former U.S. Amateur champion and professional golfer who enjoyed some success on the PGA Tour.

Kuehne was born in Dallas, Texas. His father started him playing golf at a young age. He has a sister (Kelli) who plays on the LPGA Tour, and a brother (Trip) who finished second to Tiger Woods in the 1994 U.S. Amateur and remains an amateur. Kuehne began his college career at Oklahoma State University, but later transferred to Southern Methodist University, where he earned All-American honors three times as a member of the golf team (third team in 1996, second team in 1998, and honorable mention in 1999). He won the 1998 U.S. Amateur and played on the 1998 U.S. Eisenhower Trophy team. He graduated from SMU in 1999 with a degree in communications and turned professional.

Although he has several professional wins in non-Tour events, Kuehne's best finish on the PGA Tour has been a T-2 at both the 2003 Shell Houston Open and the 2005 John Deere Classic. His best result in a major is a 65th-place finish at the 1999 U.S. Open. In 2003, he won the Tour's Driving Distance title, unseating John Daly who had won eight consecutive titles and 11 in total.

Kuehne missed the cut at the 2012 Honda Classic, his first PGA Tour event since 2007. Lingering back problems prevented Kuehne from playing for five years.

Personal life
Kuehne lives in Dallas, Texas and has three sons, Henry August Kuehne III (born 2005), Alexander James(AJ) Kuehne (born 2012) and Kroy Stefan Kuehne (born 2016). He was seen in public with tennis champion Venus Williams, whom he accompanied to the 2007 Wimbledon Championships and the 2007 U.S. Open. They broke up in 2010, after which Kuehne met his current wife Andy, whom he married in May 2011. Kuehne was initiated into Sigma Nu Fraternity while at Oklahoma State University (Epsilon Epsilon chapter).

Amateur wins
1998 U.S. Amateur

Professional wins (4)

Canadian Tour wins (2)

Other wins (2)

Other playoff record (1–0)

Results in major championships

LA = Low amateur
CUT = missed the half-way cut
Note: Kuehne never played in The Open Championship.

U.S. national team appearances
Amateur
Eisenhower Trophy: 1998
Palmer Cup: 1998 (tie), 1999 (winners)

See also
Monday Night Golf

References

External links

American male golfers
Oklahoma State Cowboys golfers
SMU Mustangs men's golfers
PGA Tour golfers
Golfers from Dallas
Golfers from Florida
People from Palm Beach Gardens, Florida
1975 births
Living people